Events in the year 1979 in Turkey.

Parliament
 16th Parliament of Turkey

Incumbents
President – Fahri Korutürk
Prime Minister –
Bülent Ecevit (up to 12 November)
 Süleyman Demirel (from 12 November)
Leader of the opposition –
 Süleyman Demirel (up to 12 November)
Bülent Ecevit (from 12 November)

Ruling party and the main opposition
  Ruling party 
  Republican People's Party (CHP) (up to 12 November)
  Justice Party (AP) (from 12 November)
  Main opposition 
Justice Party (AP) (up to 12 November)
 Republican People's Party (CHP) (from 12 November)

Cabinet
42nd government of Turkey (up to 12 November)  
43rd government of Turkey (from 12 November)

Events

February 
 1 February 1979 – Abdi İpekçi is assassinated.

March 
 3 March – Sürü wins Best Film in the 30th Berlin International Film Festival.
 15 March – Turkey withdraws from CENTO.
 29 March – U.S. Congress approves $200,000,000 in military aid.

April 
 12 April – U.S. serviceman killed in Izmir.

May 
 24 May – First local airplane in Kayseri is operational.

June 
 3 June – Trabzonspor wins the championship.
 15 June – Turkish and Greek officials commence talks on Cyprus

July 
 10 July – Mehmet Ali Ağca, charged with the murder of Abdi İpekçi, is arrested.
 13 July – A Palestinian group raids the Egyptian Embassy in Ankara.

August 
 8 August – Students at the opening ceremony of Middle East Technical University sing The Internationale instead of the  Turkish national anthem.

October 
 5 October – A permanent Palestine Liberation Organization office opens in Ankara.
 14 October – The ruling party CHP is defeated in the general election.

November 
 20 November – Deputy dean of Istanbul University, Ümit Doğanay, is killed by terrorists.
 25 November – Mehmet Ali Ağca escapes from prison.

Births
15 April – Nezihe Kalkan (Nez), singer
23 April – Bengü Erden (Bengü) singer
2 May – Yasemin Dalkılıç, female free diver

Deaths
1 February – Abdi İpekçi (assassinated at age 49), journalist 
29 April – Muhsin Ertuğrul (aged 54), theatre actor
16 June – Ayhan Işık (aged 50), movie actor
12 September – Agop Dilaçar (aged 84), Turkish linguist of Armenian descent
28 September – Cevat Yurdakul (assassinated at age 37), prosecutor and police chief of Adana

Gallery

See also
 1978–79 1.Lig
 List of Turkish films of 1979

References

 
Years of the 20th century in Turkey
Turkey
Turkey
Turkey